Archontis Stoyianov (born 29 March 1996) is a Bulgarian footballer who plays as a defender for AEZ Zakakiou.

References

External links
Archontis Stoyianov at Football Database
Archontis Stoyianov at Soccerway
Archontis Stoyianov at FC Tables Profile
Archontis Stoyianov at World Football
Archontis Stoyianov at Tables League

1996 births
Living people
Cypriot First Division players
Bulgarian expatriate footballers
Association football defenders
Bulgarian footballers
Expatriate footballers in Cyprus
AEZ Zakakiou players